Blue Punch is the third extended play by South Korean girl group Rocket Punch. The album was released digitally and physically on August 4, 2020 by Woollim Entertainment. The EP contains six tracks, including the lead single "Juicy".

Background and release 
On July 24, 2020, Woollim Entertainment released a teaser photo announcing that Rocket Punch would make a comeback with their third EP Blue Punch on August 4. 

On July 26, they released the album tracklist for Blue Punch, confirming "Juicy" as the lead single. On July 12, the identity film teaser and the group concept photo for Blue Punch was released. On July 28, the concept teaser film and individual teaser photos for Yeonhee and Suyun was released. On July 29, the concept teaser film and individual teaser photos for Yunkyoung and Sohee was released. On July 30, the concept teaser film and individual teaser photos for Juri and Dahyun was released. On July 31, the music video teaser for Juicy and another group concept photo for Blue Punch was released. Two days later, on August 2, the highlight medley for Blue Punch was released. 

On August 4, they released Blue Punch along with the music video for "Juicy".

Promotion 
Rocket Punch promoted the single "Juicy" for the first time on September 16, 2020 on Mnet's M Countdown.

Track listing

Charts

Weekly

Monthly

Release history

References 

2020 EPs
Korean-language EPs
Kakao M EPs
Woollim Entertainment EPs
Rocket Punch albums